The Stiller and Meara Show is a 1986 television sitcom pilot featuring the comedy duo Stiller and Meara (Jerry Stiller and Anne Meara) as the deputy mayor of New York (Stiller) and his wife, a TV commercial actress (Meara).

Cast
Jerry Stiller as Jerry Bender
Anne Meara	as Anne Bender
Todd Waring as Daniel Bender
Laura Innes as Krissy Bender Marino
Peter Smith as Max Bender

External links
The Stiller and Meara Show at Internet Movie Database
Stiller and Meara article at talkingcomedy.com

Television pilots not picked up as a series
NBC television specials
1980s American television series
1980s American sitcoms
1986 television specials
1980s American political comedy television series
Television shows set in New York City